Tipperary Racecourse is a horse racing venue in County Tipperary, Ireland which stages both National Hunt and Flat racing. The course is located adjacent to Limerick Junction railway station and approximately two miles from Tipperary town. Tipperary Racecourse is owned by Horse Racing Ireland. The course is left-handed and flat and measures one mile and two furlongs round. There is a five furlong sprint track which joins the main racecourse at the start of the straight.

History

The first recorded racemeeting at Tipperary Races at Barronstown Course was on 27 March 1848 but at the current Limerick Junction racetrack it was September 1916 when the meeting was attended by trainers Senator J.J. Parkinson, Stephen Grehan and Charles Moore. It remained Limerick Junction until the name was changed to Tipperary in 1986.

Notable races

References

External links
Official website

 
Horse racing venues in the Republic of Ireland
Sports venues in County Tipperary
Sports venues completed in 1916
1916 establishments in Ireland
Tipperary (town)